Mohamed el-Fers (born 1950 in Haarlem) is a Dutch writer, musician and filmmaker.

Life
El-Fers was musician in Los Compañeros (Latin American), Nass el-Ghorba (Moroccan), Tiq Maya (Moroccan), Medina (pop) and Atlal (folkrock). With this last group he had in  1982 a number 1 hit in Egypt and Sudan and appeared in  El Alem Ghani the Egyptian television show by Hamdia Hamdi.

He published in Hitweek / Aloha, De Groene Amsterdammer, Nieuwe Revu, Algemeen Dagblad, the Turkish newspaper Dünya and De Staatskrant.

Together with René Zwaap, he founded MokumTV, one of the best viewed programmes of Salto TV, a local television station in Amsterdam. For MokumTV he made several documentaries, later released on DVD.

El-Fers produced in 1996 for Hippo Records two CDs with Leo Fuld, the 'king of Yiddish music'.

He wrote biographies on e.g. Jacques Brel, Mevlana Rumi, Oum Kalsoum and Bob Marley and published travel guides about Istanbul, Lourdes and Amsterdam. He also wrote an "Encyclopedie van Hollandse Heiligen", an encyclopedia on Dutch Saints.

Together with Veyis Güngör, El-Fers took the initiative that would become the UNESCO Mevlana Year in 2007. See Mevlana800.

Some of his books in Dutch
 Bob Marley (1991) 
 Jacques Brel (1991) 
 Mehmed VI : de laatste sultan (1991) 
 Columbus (1991) 
 Oum Kalsoum (1991) 
 Mevlânâ (1992) 
 Istanbul (1993)  (2007) 
 Jacques Brel (1994, 1996 en 1998)  /

Some of his books in English
 Lourdes beyond clichés: The Complete Guide to Lourdes (2007)
 Kirkpinar, all about Turkish Oilwrestling(2007)
 Mevlana Rumi (2006)

Filmography 
 Mevlana (Hypnotic Trance Dance, complete ritual) DVD TM 04-1
 Oil over Europe-I (Turkish Oil Wrestling) DVD TM 04-2
 Mehter in Holland (Ritual Music by the Janisari) DVD TM 04-3
 Maria in de Koran (bonus: Mirakel van Amsterdam, Ida Peerdeman interview) DVD TM 04-4

Award 
For his Mevlanabiography he received on May 5, 2003 during the 3rd international Mevlanacongress of the Selçukuniversity of Konya (Turkey) the Merit of Honour by the Turkish Secretary of State for Religion, Prof. Mehmet Aydin.

References

1950 births
Living people
Dutch musicians
Dutch male writers
People from Haarlem